Graça is a neighborhood located in the southern zone of Salvador, Bahia.

Neighbourhoods in Salvador, Bahia